Pan Fengzhen (潘凤贞, born 1985) is a field hockey player from China, who won a silver medal with the national women's hockey team at the 2008 Summer Olympics in Beijing.

References

External links
 

1985 births
Living people
Chinese female field hockey players
Female field hockey goalkeepers
Field hockey players at the 2008 Summer Olympics
Olympic field hockey players of China
Olympic silver medalists for China
Olympic medalists in field hockey
Medalists at the 2008 Summer Olympics